Sir John Strathearn Hendrie  (August 15, 1857 – July 17, 1923) was the 11th Lieutenant Governor of Ontario from 1914 to 1919.

John Hendrie was born in 1857 in Hamilton, Ontario and was educated at Upper Canada College. He became a railway contractor and promoted the Hamilton Bridge Works. In 1885 he married Lena Henderson. He was Mayor of Hamilton, Ontario from 1901 to 1902. He was then Member of Provincial Parliament from 1902 to 1914, where he held the positions of Minister without Portfolio and Hydro-Electric Commissioner. He joined the Hamilton Field Artillery in 1883 and later commanded the 2nd Brigade, Canadian Field Artillery (of the Canadian Militia) until 1909. Hendrie was appointed Lieutenant Governor of Ontario in 1914 and served until 1919. Much of his time in Office was spent helping the War Effort and hosting soldiers, seamen and dignitaries. He is the only Ontario viceroy to live at two Government Houses, including Chorley Park. He was knighted in 1915, and died in Baltimore, Maryland, in 1923.

References

External links
 
 

1857 births
1923 deaths
Canadian racehorse owners and breeders
Canadian Presbyterians
Canadian Knights Commander of the Order of St Michael and St George
Canadian Commanders of the Royal Victorian Order
Lieutenant Governors of Ontario
Mayors of Hamilton, Ontario
Upper Canada College alumni